The North Korea men's national volleyball team represents North Korea in international volleyball competitions and friendly matches.

References

External links
The Volleyball Association of the D.P.R. Korea at Fédération Internationale de Volleyball (FIVB)

National sports teams of North Korea
National men's volleyball teams
Volleyball in North Korea
Men's sport in North Korea